The fixture list for the first part of the 2021 season was issued on 28 March 2021.

All times are UK local time (UTC+1) on the relevant dates.

Regular season

Round 1

Round 2

Round 3

Round 4

Round 5

Round 6

Round 7

Round 8

Round 9

Women's Super League playoffs

Round 1

Round 2

Round 3

Round 4

Round 5

Play-off semi-finals

Grand final

Women's Super League shield

Round 1

Round 2

Round 3

Round 4

Round 5

Semi-finals

Shield final

Notes

References

RFL Women's Super League
RFL Women's Super League
RFL Women's Super League
RFL Women's Super League